The 7 d'Or or Sept d'Or (French for "Seven of Gold" or "Golden Seven") was a French television production award (similar in nature to the Emmy Awards), presented by Télé 7 Jours (a weekly French magazine with listings of TV shows).  The awards were presented in the fall of each year from 1985 to 2003 (no awards were presented in 1992, 1998 and 2002) during a televised "Night of the 7 d'Or" awards ceremony (1988 and 2003 were not televised).  The first ceremonies took place in Le Lido in Paris.

Since 2003, several attempts have been made to bring back the "7 d'Or" awards.  In 2005, some sources announced a possible return of the awards, produced by Endemol; in 2008, a second return was mentioned on Direct 8, but this project didn't come to fruition; in late November 2011, the editor in chief of Télé 7 Jours announced that negotiations were taking place with France Télévisions to try to bring back the ceremonies in 2012.

List of award winners
The following is a list of the 7 d'Or award winners:

References
This article is based on the equivalent article from the French Wikipedia, retrieved on April 28, 2012.

External links
 Complete list of winners on the site of Première
 Overview of the 7 d'Or on the IMDb

French television awards
Awards established in 1985
1985 establishments in France
Awards disestablished in 2003
2003 disestablishments in France